Lewis Freestone (born 26 October 1999) is an English professional footballer who plays for Cheltenham Town as a defender.

Career

Peterborough United

He started his football career with Peterborough United and made his league debut on 14 April 2017 in a 2–1 defeat against Fleetwood Town in League One.

Bedford Town (loan)

On 4 January 2019 Freestone was loaned out to Bedford Town for a month.

Back to Peterborough

He was released by Peterborough United at the end of the 2018–19 season.

Brighton & Hove Albion

On 29 July 2019 Freestone signed a one-year contract with the Under-23 development squad at Premier League side Brighton & Hove Albion. At the end of the season, Freestone announced on his personal Twitter page that he was leaving at the expiration of his contract.

Cheltenham Town
On 1 August 2020, it was announced that Freestone had joined League Two side Cheltenham Town. He made his debut for Cheltenham in a EFL Cup first round away win over his former club, Peterborough United on 5 September 2020.

On 28 July 2022, Freestone signed a contract extension to keep him at the club until 2025.

Career statistics

Honours

Cheltenham Town
League Two Champions: 2020-21

References

1999 births
Living people
English footballers
Association football fullbacks
Peterborough United F.C. players
Cambridge City F.C. players
St Albans City F.C. players
Guiseley A.F.C. players
Nuneaton Borough F.C. players
Bedford Town F.C. players
Brighton & Hove Albion F.C. players
Cheltenham Town F.C. players
English Football League players
Southern Football League players
National League (English football) players